The Anglican Church of St Oswald at Shipton Oliffe in Shipton in the Cotswold District of Gloucestershire, England was built in the 12th century. It is a grade I listed building.

History

The earliest part of the church is Norman but was extended in the 13th century bu the addition of the chancel and south aisle.

The church was owned by Gloucester Abbey.

The west gallery and box pews were removed and the church restored between 1902 and 1904 by H.A. Prothero.

The parish is part of the Coln River Group benefice within the Diocese of Gloucester.

Architecture

The limestone building has a stone slate roof. It consists of a nave, south transept with porch and chancel.

There is a small 13th century bellcote with two pointed bell chambers.

In the church is a medieval octagonal font and 14th century piscina within a sedilia. There are fragments of wall paintings on the chancel arch and north wall. The north wall also has a blocked Norman doorway which has since had a window inserted into it.

References

Church of England church buildings in Gloucestershire
Grade I listed churches in Gloucestershire
Cotswold District